China Behind (再見中國) is a 1974 Hong Kong movie, directed by Tang Shu Shuen. The film painted a bleak portrait of communist China and the desire to escape, yielding a thirteen-year ban by British colonial authorities, that was lifted in 1987.

The film was shot in Taiwan with official authorization, and the cinematography was done by renowned Taiwanese photographer Chang Chao-tang (張照堂).

Synopsis
The plot concerns four college students seeking escape to Hong Kong at the start of the 1966 Maoist Cultural Revolution in Mainland China.

Reception
The film was selected as one of the "Best 100 Chinese Motion Pictures" during the 24th Hong Kong Film Awards ceremony on 27 March 2005. It was also selected for inclusion in Hong Kong Film Archive's "100 must-see Hong Kong movies" in 2011.

References

External links
 IMDb entry
 Hong Kong Cinemagic entry
 Hong Kong Movie Database entry

1974 films
Hong Kong drama films
1970s Mandarin-language films
1970s Hong Kong films